Nzérékoré (N’ko: ,; also spelled N'Zérékoré) is the second-largest city in Guinea by population after the capital, Conakry, and the largest city in the Guinée forestière region of southeastern Guinea. The city is the capital of Nzérékoré Prefecture.

It was the center of an uprising against French rule in 1911. It is now known as a market town and for its silverworking. The population was 107,329 according to the 1996 census. Growing dramatically since the civil wars in neighboring Liberia, Sierra Leone, and Ivory Coast, the 2014 census population was 195,027.

History 

There were 3 days of ethno-religious fighting in Nzerekore in July 2013. Fighting between ethnic Kpelle, who are Christian or animist, and ethnic Konianke, who are Muslims and close to the larger Malinke ethnic group, left at least 54 dead. The dead included people who were killed with machetes and burned alive. The violence ended after the Guinea military imposed a curfew, and President Conde made a televised appeal for calm.

Climate
Nzérékoré has a tropical savanna climate (Köppen climate classification Aw). The city features a lengthy wet season covering the months of March through November, while the remaining three months form the city's dry season.

Transportation
The N1 highway connects the city with Kankan in the north. The city is also served by Nzérékoré Airport.

Places of Worship 
 Cathédrale du Cœur Immaculé de Marie de Nzérékoré

Hospitals 
 Hôpital régional de Nzérékoré
 Poste de Santé de Nyen 2

See also
Massacre at Womey
Immaculate Heart of Mary Cathedral, Nzérékoré
Forest Guinea

References

External links 
 Maplandia

 
Regional capitals in Guinea
Sub-prefectures of the Nzérékoré Region